William Thomas Dobson (born 11 March 1986) is an English cricketer. Dobson is a right-handed batsman who bowls right-arm off-spin. He was born in Oxford, Oxfordshire and was educated at Eton College.

While studying for his degree at Durham University, Dobson made his first-class debut for Durham UCCE against Nottinghamshire in 2006. He made two further first-class appearances for the university, one in 2007 against Lancashire, while the other came against Durham in 2007. In his three first-class matches, he scored 29 runs at an average of 14.50, with a high score of 13 not out. With the ball, he took just a single wicket which came at an overall cost of 144 runs.

References

External links

1986 births
Living people
Cricketers from Oxford
People educated at Eton College
Alumni of Durham University
English cricketers
Durham MCCU cricketers